Francisco Javier "Francis" Manlapit Zamora (born December 5, 1977) is a Filipino politician, businessman, and former basketball player serving as the mayor of San Juan, Metro Manila since 2019. He previously was San Juan's vice mayor from 2010 to 2016, and a council member from 2007 to 2010.

Career

Sports
Zamora, 6'5 (playing as center, initially played for La Salle Green Hills) was the team captain of the De La Salle Green Archers who won two championships of UAAP Men's Basketball in 1998 and 1999 under then-head coach Franz Pumaren. He graduated with an AB in psychology in 1999. After his college career he played in major leagues, including the Philippine Basketball League for the teams Welcoat Paintmasters (he won two championships with them, in 1999 and 2000) and Blu Detergent. Zamora was the #35 draft pick in the 2001 PBA draft for the Sta. Lucia Realtors. However, he never saw action for Asia's pioneer play-for-pay league.

As a public servant, Zamora played in the UNTV Cup. He played for the Congress-LGU Legislators on UNTV Cup Season 1 in 2013, for the LGU Vanguards on Season 2 in 2014, and for the HOR Solons on Season 4.

Politics
Zamora received a master's degree in Public Administration from the National College of Public Administration and Governance at the University of the Philippines Diliman in 2006, and completed a business and entrepreneurship program at New York University. In 2007, Zamora started his career in politics as a councilor from the 2nd district of San Juan. He is also a member of the JCI San Juan group. Three years later, he was elected Vice Mayor.

After two consecutive terms as Vice Mayor, Zamora ran for the mayoralty post in the 2016 elections. He faced the incumbent mayor Guia Gomez, promising to stop the dynasty of the Ejercito-Estradas, who, in his words, had run the city's politics for 47 years. However, he narrowly lost the said election to Gomez.

In 2019, Zamora ran once again for the mayoralty post under the Partido Demokratiko Pilipino-Lakas ng Bayan (PDP–Laban) against incumbent Vice Mayor Janella Ejercito, the daughter of former mayor and senator Jinggoy Estrada who was endorsed by the administration-backed Hugpong ng Pagbabago her grandfather, former President Joseph Estrada, and the outgoing mayor Guia Gomez. In the election, Zamora defeated Estrada by a margin of 10,247 votes, ending control of the Ejercito-Estrada clan of the city after 50 years.

Zamora was reelected to a second consecutive term as mayor in 2022. On November 26, 2022, he was elected president of the Metro Manila Council and co-chairperson of the Regional Development Council.

Personal life
He is the son of Ronaldo Zamora, a long-time congressman in San Juan who served the city for almost two decades and Rose Marie Manlapit-Zamora. His sisters Ysabel Maria ("Bel") and Amparo Maria ("Pammy") are also in politics, currently serving as congresswomen from San Juan's lone district and Taguig's 2nd district, respectively. He married Keri Neri in 2001 and has four children. His daughter, Amanda, is a model who competed as a housemate in the "Connect" season of Pinoy Big Brother in 2021, where she was eliminated in the last eviction alongside Ralph Malibunas.

Since 2014, Zamora is the owner of a Goldilocks Bakeshop franchise branch at Greenhills Shopping Center.

References

1977 births
Filipino men's basketball players
Filipino sportsperson-politicians
Nacionalista Party politicians
PDP–Laban politicians
Living people
Basketball players from Metro Manila
De La Salle Green Archers basketball players
Mayors of San Juan, Metro Manila
Metro Manila city and municipal councilors
Sta. Lucia Realtors draft picks